Christians comprise almost 0.4% of the population of bangladesh. The following is a list of notable people from christian background:

Literature
Michael Madhusudan Dutta, he was born in Jessore, Bangladesh

Music
Robin Ghosh
Andrew Kishore
Samar Das
Robin Ghosh
Adit Ozbert

Films
Jumbo
Catherine Masud, director
Olivia Gomez, actress

Television
Tony Dias
Priya Dias
Dipannita Martin
Loren Mendes
Lara Lotus
Allen Shuvro

Magic
Jewel Aich

Philanthropy
Samson Chowdhury

Politics
Promode Mankin, former Minister of Social Welfare Affairs and member of parliament
Jewel Areng, member of parliament

References

Christianity in Bangladesh